The Oleksiivska line is the third and newest line of the Kharkiv Metro that was opened in 1995.

The line cuts the city of Kharkiv, the second largest city in Ukraine, on a northeast–southwest axis. The Oleksiivska line is third behind the Saltivska line with a daily ridership of 141,150 passengers. Work to expand the Oleksiivska line past its southern terminus, at Metrobudivnykiv, started late 2015 and is expected to be completed in the early 2020s.

History

Timeline

Name changes
There has been only one name change on the Oleksiivska line after the station was opened: Metrobudivelnyky (1995–2000) →Metrobudivnykiv imeni H.I. Vashchenka (2000–2016) →Metrobudivnykiv The Peremoha station project was originally named Prospekt Peremohy during the early planning stages until the name was decided upon the current one.

Stations

Six of the Oleksiivska line stations were built close to the surface, with only the Derzhprom and Arkhitektora Beketova stations constructed deep underground. Five of the shallow stations consist of a central platform and vaulted ceiling supported by columns, with another one being a single-vault station, having a vaulted roof with no ceiling support. The two deep stations are both pylon stations, in which the central hall is separated by arcades leading to the station platforms.

Transfers
Following the traditional Soviet metro planning, the third line (Oleksiivska line) is crossed by two other line segments at high traffic locations. Currently, the Oleksiivska line has two transfer stations with the Kholodnohirsko–Zavodska line (red line) and the Saltivska line (blue line):

Technical specifications
Just like with the Kyiv Metro, government planning agencies allowed for a maximum of five carriage trains that would fit on the  station platforms without any modification to the station structure. Specifically, 12 five-carriage trains are assigned to serve the Oleksiivska line, served by the Depot-1 "Moskovske" from the Kholodnohirsko-Zavodska line. Oleksiivkska line connects to Kholodnohirsko-Zavodska line with a service link between Metrobudivnykiv and Prospect Haharina stations. A new depot will be constructed specifically for the Oleksiivska line, located immediately north of the Peremoha station.

Currently, trains model 81-717/714 and 81-718/719 are operating Oleksiivska line.

Future extension
Since the 2010 opening of the Oleksiivska station, the Oleksiivska line became the second longest line segment of the system. To follow the Peremoha station, the planned depot (Depot-3) "Oleksiivske" is set to be completed in 2018.

A perspective extension towards the Kharkiv International Airport to the south would add the Derzhavinska, Odeska, Motel Druzhba, and Aeroport stations. However, only two of the stations, Derzhavinska and Odeska, respectively, were outlined in the "Oblast Program of Construction and the Expansion of the Kharkiv Metropoliten, 2007-2012." Construction work on the two planned stations began late 2015; they were originally planned to be completed in 2019, but will not open until sometime in the 2020s owing to construction delays. This part of the line will be 3.47 km long at a building cost of 2.66 billion hryvnia.

Notes

References

Kharkiv Metro lines
Railway lines opened in 1995